Enfield High School was a high school at Enfield, South Australia. It opened in 1953 and closed in 2010, its functions being absorbed into Roma Mitchell Secondary College.

History

When Enfield High School opened in 1953 in its present site, but on the eastern boundary, it was the first high school in the northern suburbs. Until then the only options were Adelaide High and Nailsworth Technical School. Even though the school was at Enfield, it was called Enfield High School because it was in the Port Adelaide Enfield Council area.

Students travelled from as far away as Virginia and Salisbury. These students came by train to Kilburn and then on to the school by bus or on foot. It has been said that some intrepid students came all the way on horseback and tied their horses up to the water troughs on the western side, where the main building once stood.

Originally the school consisted of two brick buildings, toilets and shelter areas, and two 'temporary' portable wooden buildings. One of these contained the staff room, headmaster's office, sickroom, library, science laboratory and a canteen in the second unused science laboratory. The other building on the lower level contained four classrooms: each was painted in a different colour. The two wooden buildings, with new cladding, and one of the brick toilets which remained until the schools demolition.

On the first day, 10 February, there were 95 students – 49 boys and 46 girls – and a staff of six. There were only three classes: 1A had only boys and 1B had only girls. Unusually for those times 1C was a mixed class. Boys and girls came together for subjects like Latin or French. The headmaster, Mr Pyne, had one senior master, Mr Frick, one senior mistress, Mrs Peart, and four other teachers.

The school expected enough students to stay at school to make one Year 10 class in 1955: all the rest would have left for work. But in fact 48 students sat for the Intermediate Examination. Of these, 44 were original students.

Fire 
In the early hours of Friday morning (approx 3.20am) on 24 March 2017, the majority of the former Enfield High site was destroyed by Fire. Smoke erupted from the top level of the vacated school that was due to be demolished the following week to make way for a new housing development. Fire fighting efforts were hampered by corrugated metal sheeting secured to the structure resulting in a fire visible from the Adelaide metropolitan area and requiring approximately 60 Fire Fighters in attendance. The remaining structures were demolished later that year and the former site is now occupied by residential development.

Notable former students
 Robyn Archer – entertainer
Craig Bradley – footballer
John Quiggin – economist
Stuart Dew – AFL footballer (Port Adelaide 1997–2006 & Hawthorn 2008–2009) AFL Coach 2017+
Dale Agius –  First Nations Commissioner, South Australia 2022

References

External links
 EHS History

High schools in South Australia
Public schools in South Australia
Educational institutions established in 1953
1953 establishments in Australia